"Once in a While" is a song by American pop duo Timeflies. It was made available for digital download on March 18, 2016 through Forty8Fifty Music Group and Epic Records. The song became a viral hit on Spotify, gathering over 300 million streams. It also reached the top 40 charts in at least 8 countries across Europe, as well as the top 40 of the U.S. Billboard Mainstream Top 40 chart.

Live performances
Timeflies performed "Once in a While" on Good Day L.A. on September 7, 2016.

Charts

Weekly charts

Year-end charts

Certifications

Release history

References

2016 singles
Timeflies songs
2016 songs
Epic Records singles
Sony Music singles